The Funhouse Tour was the fourth concert tour by American singer-songwriter Pink. The tour supported her fifth studio album, Funhouse (2008). The tour visited Europe, Australia and North America. According to Pollstar, the Funhouse Tour (2009) earned more than $100 million with more than 1.5 million in attendance. The Australian leg of the tour broke the record for the biggest tour in the history of the country. The Australian shows were attended by 660,000 people and grossed over $55 million.

Background
The tour was announced on October 14, 2008, nearly two weeks before the release of her fifth studio album. Pink stated, "I'm so excited to get back on the road. The 'Funhouse' tour ideas are running rampant in my head. Who knows what they'll come out as... And I can't wait to see." The tour followed her internationally successful I'm Not Dead Tour, which became one of the biggest tours in 2006 and 2007.

The tour also marked the first time Pink has headlined a North American arena tour. To describe the event, Pink stated, "I've waited 30 years for this tour. I really wasn't sure if anyone was going to show [up]."

Synopsis
The concert starts with a video introduction which feature Pink watching TV. She then gets up and puts her lovers hand into a warm glass of water. She goes upstairs and gets changed into a white shirt and some jeans. She gets on a motorcycle and rides off, resembling her "Funhouse" music video. She finds a clown crying on the side of the road. She gets off her bike and gives him a flower hat. As the video ends, the clown appears on stage. He walks up to the end of the catwalk and finds a Box with a handle. As he turns the handle, a trapdoor opens, and Pink is lifted up into the air on a rope. The song "Bad Influence" then starts. She gets lowered down onto the main stage and starts to sing. She then sings "Just Like a Pill", 
"Who Knew", Ave Mary A and "Don't Let Me Get Me". She then goes offstage. At some shows, Pink might perform "It's All Your Fault" after "Just Like A Pill".

A red couch appears on the stage and Pink is seen walking over to it. She then starts to sing "I Touch Myself". Whilst singing "I Touch Myself", hands come out of the couch and touch her. She then performs "Please Don't Leave Me". She briefly goes offstage whilst her dancers come onstage. She comes back on to perform "U + Ur Hand". A love heart shaped bed appears onstage as she performs "Leave Me Alone (I'm Lonely)" and "So What". She then goes offstage again. At some shows, Pink might perform "One Foot Wrong" after "I Touch Myself".

Her pianist then starts to play piano. She then comes back onstage to perform "Family Portrait". She then plays "I Don't Believe You" on the guitar. She would then perform "Crystal Ball", "Trouble" and "Babe I'm Gonna Leave You". She then goes offstage. At some shows, Pink might perform "Dear Mr. President" instead of "Crystal Ball".

Two of her dancers then come and perform ballet moves. This is then followed by "Sober" when she performs a trapeze. She quickly goes offstage and returns for "Bohemian Rhapsody". Four mirrors are brought onstage as she performs "Funhouse" and "Crazy". She says goodbye to the crowd and goes offstage. On the last leg, she would perform "Stupid Girls" after "Funhouse".

For the encore, She performed "Get the Party Started" and "Glitter in the Air". For all shows except for the Premiere, there would be a video montage of all her videos with "God Is a DJ" playing after "Get The Party Started". For "Get The Party Started", she would perform some acrobatics. She would then go offstage. After a costume change, she would come back onstage to perform the final number, "Glitter In The Air". She would be in the air performing some more acrobatics. Whilst that was happening, she would get lowered into the trapdoor that was used earlier in the show and be dipped in water. After she was lowered back onto the main stage, she bowed and walked offstage. The screen in the background showed THE END on it.

Set list
{{hidden
| headercss = background: #ccccff; font-size: 100%; width: 65%;
| contentcss = text-align: left; font-size: 100%; width: 75%;
| header = Premiere
| content =
"Bad Influence"
"Just Like a Pill"
"Who Knew"
"Please Don't Leave Me"
"It's All Your Fault"
"I Touch Myself"
"One Foot Wrong"
"U + Ur Hand"
"Ave Mary A"
"Leave Me Alone (I'm Lonely)"
"So What"
"Family Portrait"
"I Don't Believe You"
"Crystal Ball"
"Trouble"
"Babe I'm Gonna Leave You"
"Sober"
"Bohemian Rhapsody"
"Funhouse"
"Crazy"
Encore
"Get the Party Started"
"Glitter in the Air"

Source:
}} 
{{hidden
| headercss = background: #ccccff; font-size: 100%; width: 65%;
| contentcss = text-align: left; font-size: 100%; width: 75%;
| header = European First Leg
| content =
"Bad Influence"
"Just Like a Pill"
"Who Knew"
"Ave Mary A" 
"Don't Let Me Get Me"
"I Touch Myself"
"Please Don't Leave Me"
"U + Ur Hand"
"Leave Me Alone (I'm Lonely)"
"So What"
"Family Portrait"
"I Don't Believe You"
"Crystal Ball" 
"Trouble"
"Babe I'm Gonna Leave You"
"Sober"
"Bohemian Rhapsody"
"Funhouse"
"Crazy"
Encore
"Get the Party Started"
"God Is a DJ" (Video Interlude)
"Glitter in the Air" 
}}
{{hidden
| headercss = background: #ccccff; font-size: 100%; width: 65%;
| contentcss = text-align: left; font-size: 100%; width: 75%;
| header = Australia
| content =
"Bad Influence"
"Just Like a Pill" 
"It's All Your Fault (June 30, 2009 onwards)
"Who Knew"
"Ave Mary A (Except June 13, 30) 
"Don't Let Me Get Me"
"I Touch Myself"
"Please Don't Leave Me"
"U + Ur Hand"
"Leave Me Alone (I'm Lonely)"
"So What"
"Family Portrait"
"I Don't Believe You"
"Crystal Ball (Except August 25)" 
"Dear Mr. President" (August 25 only)"
"Trouble"
"Babe I'm Gonna Leave You"
"Sober (Except June 20)"
"Bohemian Rhapsody"
"Funhouse"
"Crazy"
Encore
"Get the Party Started"
"God Is A DJ" (Video Interlude)
"Glitter in the Air (Except June 16 and 20)"

Source:
}}

{{hidden
| headercss = background: #ccccff; font-size: 100%; width: 65%;
| contentcss = text-align: left; font-size: 100%; width: 75%;
| header = North America
| content =
"Bad Influence"
"Just Like A Pill"
"Who Knew"
"Don't Let Me Get Me"
"I Touch Myself"
"Please Don't Leave Me"
"U + Ur Hand"
"Leave Me Alone (I'm Lonely)"
"So What"
"Family Portrait"
"I Don't Believe You"
"Dear Mr President"
"Trouble"
"Babe I'm Gonna Leave You"
"Sober"
"Bohemian Rhapsody"
"Funhouse"
"Crazy"
Encore
"Get the Party Started"
"God Is a DJ" (Video Interlude)
"Glitter in the Air"

Source:
}}

{{hidden
| headercss = background: #ccccff; font-size: 100%; width: 65%;
| contentcss = text-align: left; font-size: 100%; width: 75%;
| header = European Second Leg 
| content =
"Bad Influence"
"Just Like A Pill"
"Who Knew"
"Ave Mary A" 
"Don't Let Me Get Me"
"I Touch Myself"
"Please Don't Leave Me"
"U + Ur Hand"
"Leave Me Alone (I'm Lonely)"
"So What"
"Family Portrait"
"I Don't Believe You"
"Dear Mr. President (October 17, 25 and 30 and November 7 and 23 only)" 
"Crystal Ball (October 24, 25, 30 only)
"Trouble"
"Babe I'm Gonna Leave You"
"Sober (Except November 10 and December 15)"
"Bohemian Rhapsody"
"Funhouse"
"Stupid Girls"
"Crazy"
Encore
"Get the Party Started"
"God Is a DJ" (Video Interlude)
"Glitter in the Air"
}}

Additional notes
During the August 23 performance at the WIN Entertainment Centre in Wollongong, New South Wales, the tour crew and dancers did an impromptu performance of Michael Jackson's "Thriller".

Tour dates

Box office score data

Reception

Commercial
Overall ticket sales are estimated to have surpassed nearly two million. By July 2009, the tour grossed over $50 million, ranking 8th highest-grossing tour in the world. By November 2009, the tour grossed over $100 million, ranking as 5th highest-grossing tour of 2009.

Sales started on October 10, 2009 in the Netherlands. The show of February 28 at The Ahoy was sold out as a second show was scheduled for the following night. A third night at the arena was announced for December 5, 2009 (although this date was later changed to December 6, 2009).
In Australia, ticket sales were exceptionally high. In 2007 she broke the record of biggest female tour ever with 35 shows in Australia, grossing $41 million. In 2009, she broke her own record, with 58 shows surpassing John Farnham's "Whispering Jack Tour" with the most shows in Australia. She performed 17 shows at Rod Laver Arena in Melbourne, Victoria, breaking Farnham's record for most shows at the venue during one tour. In Sydney, Pink performed 12 shows—of which 10 were performed at the Sydney Entertainment Centre. She performed for nearly 110,000 spectators (at this arena), making her the biggest live act in Sydney (surpassing Kylie Minogue with an attendance record of nearly 93,000 spectators).
The American singer/songwriter performed at Melbourne's Rod Laver Arena on seventeen nights throughout the summer with ticket sales topping $17.2 million ($21.7 Australian). Combined attendance for all shows at the Melbourne tennis stadium was 214,956. Pink also played twelve shows in Sydney – ten shows during June and July at the Sydney Entertainment Centre and two in August at Acer Arena in the city's Olympic Park. Overall attendance in Sydney was 146,420 with $12.6 million in ticket sales ($15.5 Australian). With tour grosses topping $55 million from the Australian leg, Pink is ranked among the top ten tours worldwide for 2009.

To congratulate Pink on eleven sold out concerts at the Brisbane Entertainment Centre, the artist was given a public toilet located on the upper level of the arena, entitled "P!nk Ladies".

The Funhouse Summer Carnival Tour and the Funhouse Tour sold a combined total 3 million tickets.

Critical
The show received critical acclaim, with critics commenting on its theatricality and Pink's live singing.

"A Pink show is more than just a pop concert – it's a major spectacle that you can’t take your eyes off. The show was simply mesmerising." – Aberdeen Evening Express

"Pink can rock it, that's for sure. She has the anthems, the voice and the sass…4 stars" – The Glasgow Herald
 "She's no slouch as an aerial dare-devil, but here's one rock star at her most compelling when she has two feet planted squarely on the ground." – The Independent
 "Her singing was perfect, even when she was suspended mid-air, on her back and spinning rapidly on her harness." – Express & Star
 Her stage presence was also praised as "alluring and suggestive", likening the show to Janet Jackson's Velvet Rope Tour. – OC Register

Broadcast and recordings

A DVD and live album of the tour was recorded on July 17 and 18, 2009 in Sydney, Australia. The DVD includes both "It's All Your Fault" and "Ave Mary A". Pink: Live in Australia  was released in Australia on October 14, 2009, two days before its planned release. It was scheduled for release on October 2, 2009 but had to be pushed backed due to overwhelming demand. The DVD was also released in The Netherlands on October 28, 2009 and in the United Kingdom on November 2, 2009. An alternate version of the DVD was released in the United States on October 27, 2009. This version, titled Funhouse Tour: Live in Australia, includes the tour DVD, but is also sold with a live CD of the same concert.

The concert was also aired on VH1 on January 1, 2010 as the premiere concert of their "Friday Night Alright" block.

Personnel
 Lead vocals, aerobatics, dancing, acoustic guitar, executive producer, creator – P!nk
 Musical director, keyboards, vocals – Paul Mirkovich
 Drums – Rick Hardinge 
 Lead guitar – Justin Derrico
 Bass guitar – Eva Gardner
 Keyboards, rhythm guitar, vocals – Kat Lucas
 Violin, vocals –Jessy Greene
 Vocals – Stacy Campbell
 Vocals – Jenny Douglas-Foote
 Dancing, choreography – Alison Faulk
 Dancing, choreography – Leo Moctezuma
 Dancing – Reina Hidalgo
 Dancing – Nikki Tuazon
 Dancing – Addie Yungmee
 Dancing – Joseph Errico
 Aerialist – Sebastien Stella
 Aerial choreography – Dreya Weber
 Stage director, executive producer – Baz Halpin
 Director – Larn Poland
 Tour producer – Roger Davies (RDWM)
 Tour manager – Nick R. Cua

Notes

References

Pink (singer) concert tours
2009 concert tours
Concert tours of Australia
Concert tours of Canada
Concert tours of Europe
Concert tours of France
Concert tours of Germany
Concert tours of Ireland
Concert tours of North America
Concert tours of Oceania
Concert tours of the United Kingdom
Concert tours of the United States